Tolypanthus is a genus of plants in the family Loranthaceae.

Species include:
 Tolypanthus esquirolii (H.Lév.) Lauener
 Tolypanthus gardneri (Thwaites) Tiegh.
 Tolypanthus involucratus (Roxb.) Tiegh.
 Tolypanthus lagenifer (Wight ex J.Graham) Tiegh.
 Tolypanthus lunatus Rajasek.
 Tolypanthus maclurei (Merr.) Danser
 Tolypanthus pustulatus Barlow

References

Loranthaceae
Loranthaceae genera